The Grimme-Preis ("Grimme Award"; prior to 2011: Adolf-Grimme-Preis) is one of the most prestigious German television awards. It is named after the first general director of Nordwestdeutscher Rundfunk, Adolf Grimme. It has been referred to in Kino magazine as the "German TV Oscar".

The awards ceremony takes place annually at Theater Marl in Marl, North Rhine-Westphalia, and is hosted by the Grimme-Institut. Since 1964, it awards productions "that use the specific possibilities of the medium of television in an extraordinary manner and at the same time can serve as examples regarding content and method". The award was endowed by the German Community College association. Rainer Werner Fassbinder received an honorable mention in 1974 for his film World on a Wire. Since then, German veteran director Dominik Graf has received 10 awards for his various films. Danish director Lars von Trier was awarded a Grimme-Preis in 1996 for his miniseries The Kingdom. Director Christian Petzold has been awarded the prize twice, for his films Wolfsburg and Something to Remind Me. In 2016, the series Deutschland 83 was one of the four recipients in the principal "fiction" category. The TV series Dark became in 2018 the first Netflix series to receive the award.

In addition to the Grimme Award, the Grimme Institute also awards the Grimme Online Award and the German Radio Award (de).

Notable laureates

Fictional characters
In Look Who's Back by Timur Vermes, a novel in which Hitler awakens in the 21st century and becomes a comedian, the Grimme Prize is awarded to Hitler.

References

External links

 Official website

German television awards